is a Kofun period keyhole-shaped burial mound, located in the Jizodō neighborhood of the city of Kaizuka, Osaka in the Kansai region of Japan. The tumulus was designated a National Historic Site of Japan in 1956. It is also called the

Overview
It is located on a fluvial terrace of the Kogi River, and is orientated to the west. The tumulus has a total length of 73 meters with a 43-meter diameter posterior circular portion. The tumulus was originally covered in fukiishi  and had a large number and variety of haniwa, including cylindrical, "morning glory-shaped", figurative and house-shaped styles. There was no trace of a moat around the tumulus, and the location and structure of the burial chamber was not clear. It is believed to have been built around the latter half of the 4th century. Six more smaller kofun (four circular-type ( and two square-type have been found on the grounds of the nearby Kaizuka Minami Elementary School, forming a cluster of tumuli, suggesting that this was the burial ground for local tribal chieftains during the 4th and 5th centuries.

Toyotomi Hideyoshi is known to have established a temporary field headquarters on this tumulus in 1585, during his invasion of Kii Province]. The tumulus (which was then in private hands) was scheduled for demolition for use as landfill in 1952 before a rescue archaeology excavation in 1952 placed a stop. The owner donated the site to Kaizuka City in 1957, but a through archaeological excavation was not conducted until 2000 to 2002. In the meantime, the surroundings have been completely developed as a housing estate. The haniwa excavated from the site were designed a Kaizuka City Tangible Cultural Property in 2006.

The tumulus is about a ten-minute walk from Izumi-Hashimoto Station on the JR West Hanwa Line.

Total length 72 meters:
Anterior rectangular portion 27 meters wide x 4 meters high, 3-tier
West Constriction 23 x 13 meters
Posterior circular portion 43 meter diameter x 5 meters high, 3-tiers

Gallery

See also
List of Historic Sites of Japan (Osaka)

References

External links

Kaizuka City home page

History of Osaka Prefecture
Kaizuka, Osaka
Historic Sites of Japan
Archaeological sites in Japan
Kofun